This is a list of public art in Buckinghamshire, in England. This list applies only to works of public art accessible in an outdoor public space. For example, this does not include any artworks in a museum or private collection.

Aylesbury

Burnham

Denham

High Wycombe

Marlow

Milton Keynes

References 

Buckinghamshire
Tourist attractions in Buckinghamshire
English art
Public art